Galaxy is a shopping centre in Szczecin, Poland that is located near the intersection of Wyzwolenia Avenue and Malczewskiego Street, near the Pazim building. It is owned by Echo Investment and was opened in 2003.

Description 
The Shopping centre was expanded with a new wing in 2017, which was built in place of the Orbis Neptun hotel which was demolished in 2017. After the expansion, the total shopping area of the centre is 59,500 m2 (640452.67 square feet). The building has 3 storeys. It currently has 200 stores, gastronomical locations and an Auchan hypermarket (previously Real) with an area of 7,700 m2 (82882.11 square feet). Additionally, it has a Multikino cinema, a bowling alley and a Calypso gym. It has 2 car parks: multistorey and underground with a combined capacity of 1,500 parking spaces. The owner declared, that in 2012, the shopping centre has been visited by around 12 million people.

References 

Buildings and structures in Szczecin
Shopping malls in Szczecin
Shopping malls established in 2003
2003 establishments in Poland